There are multiple churches known as Our Lady of the Sacred Heart Church, including:

Australia
 Our Lady of the Sacred Heart Church, Randwick, New South Wales
 Our Lady of the Sacred Heart Church, Thursday Island, Queensland

Malta
 Our Lady of the Sacred Heart Parish Church, Sliema